The  following is a list of notable Irish Canadians.

List
 Eugenie Bouchard - Tennis player 
 Stephen Boyd, actor (his parents were Irish-Canadians)
 Chartres Brew - Gold commissioner, Chief Constable and judge in the Colony of British Columbia
 Ed Broadbent - politician and political scientist
 Morley Callaghan - novelist and playwright
 Jordan Clark - dancer and actress
 D'Alton Corry Coleman (1879–1956), president of Canadian Pacific Railway 
 Jim Coleman (1911–2001), Canadian sports journalist and Member of the Order of Canada
 Stompin' Tom Connors – country and folk musician
 Peter Warren Dease - Arctic explorer
 Bernard Devlin - 19th-century lawyer, journalist, politician
 Elias Disney – the father of Roy and Walt Disney.
 Denny Doherty - singer and songwriter, The Mamas & the Papas
 Jimmy Ferguson - musician, The Irish Rovers
 Michael Foley, Cyclist
 John Furlong - CEO of Vancouver Organizing Committee for the 2010 Olympic and Paralympic Winter Games
 Ryan Gosling - actor
 Shenae Grimes - actress
 Emm Gryner - guitarist, songwriter-singer
 Ciaran Hearn - rugby union player 
 Dan Hennessey - actor
 Jill Hennessy - actress
 W. A. Hewitt - sports executive and journalist, Hockey Hall of Fame inductee
 Walter Huston - actor
 Joshua Jackson - actor 
 Rocky Johnson, professional wrestler and father of Dwayne ("The Rock") Johnson
 Jason Kenney - Premier Of Alberta
 Larkin Kerwin - Physicist, First Lay Rector of Université Laval, founding president of the Canadian Space Agency
 W. P. Kinsella - novelist and short story writer
 Paul Martin - 21st Prime Minister of Canada
 Bat Masterson - lawman
 Connor McDavid - NHL player
 James McGee - tennis player
 Thomas D'Arcy McGee – Father of Confederation
 Logan McGuinness - professional boxer
 Catherine McKenna - Minister of Environment and Climate Change of Canada
 Amybeth McNulty - actress
 George Millar - musician of The Irish Rovers
 Will Millar - musician, The Irish Rovers
 Tom Mulcair - politician, former Leader of Official Opposition
 Stefan Molyneux - far-right activist
 Ben Mulroney - television personality, host of etalk, and son of Brian Mulroney
 Brian Mulroney – 18th Prime Minister of Canada
 Alice Munro - author
 Owen Nolan - NHL player
 Eugene O'Keefe - Canadian businessman and philanthropist; born in Bandon, County Cork; founded the O'Keefe Brewery Company of Toronto Limited in 1891
 Kevin O'Leary - Businessman and television personality
 Seamus O'Regan - Canadian-Irish former television personality, and Member of Parliament
 Chauncey O'Toole - rugby union player
 Erin O'Toole - Canadian politician and leader of the opposition
 Lindi Ortega - singer-songwriter
 Gerard Parkes - actor 
 John Draper Perrin - entrepreneur, mining executive
 Johnny Reid - singer-songwriter
 Ryan Reynolds - actor
 Pat Riordan - rugby union player 
 Louis St. Laurent - 12th Prime Minister of Canada
 Mack Sennett - producer, director, writer, actor and founder of Keystone Studios
 Martin Short - comedian, actor, singer and writer
 Sir John Thompson - 4th Prime Minister of Canada
 Daniel Tracey - doctor, journalist, politician
 Kevin Vickers - former ambassador and diplomat
 Mary Walsh – comedian
 Brandon Yip - ice hockey player

See also

 Canada–Ireland relations
 Irish Montreal before the Great Famine
 List of Ireland-related topics
 Irish diaspora
 Irish Australians
 Irish (ethnicity)

References

Irish

Canadian
Irish